Eduard Heine (16 March 1821, Berlin – October 1881, Halle) was a German mathematician in Prussia. His name is given to several mathematical concepts that he was instrumental in developing:

 Andréief–Heine identity
 Heine–Borel theorem
 Heine–Cantor theorem
 Heine–Stieltjes polynomials
 Heine definition of continuity
 Heine functions
 Heine's identity
 Mehler–Heine formula

Heine, Eduard